Resonance Volume 2 is a compilation album by the British rock band Anathema. It was released in 2002 as a follow-up to 2001's Resonance.

Track listing
 "Lovelorn Rhapsody" – 5:49 (from album Serenades)
 "Sweet Tears" – 4:12 (from album Serenades)
 "Sleepless 96" – 4:31 (1996 version, original from album Serenades)
 "Eternal Rise of the Sun" – 6:34 (from album Serenades)
 "Sunset of Age" – 6:55 (from album The Silent Enigma)
 "Nocturnal Emission" – 4:18 (from album The Silent Enigma)
 "A Dying Wish" – 8:12 (from album The Silent Enigma)
 "Hope" – 5:54 (from album Eternity)
 "Cries on the Wind" – 5:03 (from album Eternity)
 "Fragile Dreams" – 5:32 (from album Alternative 4)
 "Empty" – 3:00 (from album Alternative 4)
 "Nailed to the Cross / 666" – 4:10 (from single We Are the Bible)
 "Mine Is Yours"  (video) (from ep Pentecost III)

Notes
The version of "Lovelorn Rhapsody" featured on this compilation is different from that of the Serenades performance and was originally exclusive to the Peaceville Volume 4 compilation.

Resonance Vol. 2
2002 compilation albums
Albums with cover art by Travis Smith (artist)